Thanthulage William Fernando was a Sri Lankan politician. He served as the Member of Parliament for Nuwara Eliya (1960 to 1965) and Mayor of Nuwara Eliya.

References

Sri Lanka Freedom Party politicians
Members of the 4th Parliament of Ceylon
Members of the 5th Parliament of Ceylon
People from British Ceylon